John van de Rest (19 March 1940 – 6 April 2022) was a Dutch film director and screenwriter.

Filmography
 (1972–1974)
 (1973)
 (1976)
 (1988–1991)

Personal life
Van de Rest was married to actress  from 1974 until her death in 2009. The couple had a son, . John van de Rest died in Laren, North Holland on 6 April 2022 at the age of 82.

References

1940 births
2022 deaths
Dutch film directors
Dutch male screenwriters
People from Vlissingen